Antonio Pinilla Miranda (born 25 February 1971) is a Spanish retired professional footballer who played mainly as a forward.

Best known for his stints with Tenerife and Gimnàstic – he began playing professionally for Barcelona, but had virtually no impact for its first team – he also served as general manager at the latter club, playing in more than 500 official matches for seven different clubs in exactly 20 years, 242 of those in La Liga over the course of 11 seasons (40 goals scored).

Club career

Barcelona
Born in Badalona, Barcelona, Catalonia, Pinilla was formed in the youth ranks of FC Barcelona. During the 1989–90 season, a week before turning 19, Johan Cruyff gave him the chance to make his La Liga debut, on 18 February 1990 in a match against Rayo Vallecano: he appeared 25 minutes in the 4–1 away win, having come on as a substitute for Julio Salinas.

The following campaign, Barcelona won the league and Pinilla appeared in seven matches, scoring a decisive goal against Valencia CF. He also played in the final of the UEFA Cup Winners' Cup, subbing in for veteran José Ramón Alexanko in a 1–2 loss against Manchester United.

However, strong competition in the emerging Dream Team meant Pinilla had to leave Barça on loan, and he joined RCD Mallorca, scoring four goals in a season which ended in top flight relegation. The following campaign he signed with top level newcomer Albacete Balompié, only missing two games as the Castile-La Mancha club retained its league status.

Tenerife and Nàstic
Pinilla was finally released in the summer of 1993, signing for CD Tenerife where he remained seven seasons, helping the Canary Islands team to the semi-finals of the 1996–97 UEFA Cup. He previously entered the club's history books when scoring its first goal ever in European competition, against AJ Auxerre on 15 September 1993; 1998–99 brought with it relegation, and the player followed the side into the second division.

After one season with UD Salamanca, also in the second level, Pinilla joined Catalonia's Gimnàstic de Tarragona, freshly promoted into that tier. His seven goals, however, proved insufficient to prevent the team from being immediately relegated; in addition, a serious knee injury in the final months of the campaign forced him into the operating room which led two a six-month period of inactivity, in turn prompting his release.

After recovering on his own, Pinilla was re-taken by Gimnàstic in the 2003 winter transfer window. Although he barely managed to make the team while they were in division three, he became a basic element in their return to the second level, adding five goals in the last ten days of 2005–06 in an historic return to the top flight.

Pinilla served as captain during Gimnàstic's short-lived spell in the top division, netting twice from 28 appearances for the last-ranked team, against RCD Espanyol (4–0 at home) and against Athletic Bilbao (2–0, away). On 11 September 2007, the club was proclaimed champion of the Catalonia Cup for the first time after a 2–1 defeat of Barcelona – the player, who started the final, netted one of the Grana. 

At the end of the 2007–08 season, after helping Nàstic retain its second tier status, Pinilla announced his retirement after having competed in 200 games overall with the club, promptly being named its general manager and leaving the post in early February 2010.

International career
Pinilla never earned one full cap for Spain, but did represent the nation in various youth levels. Additionally, he was a member of the squad that won the gold medal at the 1992 Summer Olympics, appearing in two of six games.

Pinilla also played seven matches with the unofficial Catalonia national team.

Honours
Barcelona
La Liga: 1990–91
Supercopa de España: 1991
UEFA Cup Winners' Cup: runner-up 1990–91

Gimnàstic
Copa Catalunya: 2007

Spain U23
Summer Olympic Games: 1992

References

External links

Gimnàstic profile  

1971 births
Living people
People from Badalona
Sportspeople from the Province of Barcelona
Spanish footballers
Footballers from Catalonia
Association football forwards
La Liga players
Segunda División players
Segunda División B players
FC Barcelona C players
FC Barcelona Atlètic players
FC Barcelona players
RCD Mallorca players
Albacete Balompié players
CD Tenerife players
UD Salamanca players
Gimnàstic de Tarragona footballers
Spain youth international footballers
Spain under-21 international footballers
Spain under-23 international footballers
Olympic footballers of Spain
Footballers at the 1992 Summer Olympics
Olympic medalists in football
Medalists at the 1992 Summer Olympics
Olympic gold medalists for Spain